A New Beginning is the first studio album by the Dutch rock/melodic metal band La-Ventura.

Track listing

Notes
Re-released in 2008 by Renaissance Records.
In 2009, the debut has also been released in Germany, Switzerland and Austria in June 2009, through the efforts of Gordeon Music, Dr-Music Distribution and Intergroove.
A video was made for "Trefoil".

Personnel
Michael "Mike" Saffrie - bass
Sascha "Saz" Kondic - guitars
Carla van Huizen-Douw - vocals
Erwin Polderman (ex-Orphanage) - drums
Marco van Boven - keys

References

2007 albums
La-Ventura albums